Speilsalen (The Hall of Mirrors) was a natural glacial formation caused by a river underneath a glacier in the Trollheimen mountains in the municipality of Oppdal in Trøndelag county, Norway.  It was located at the northeast base of the mountain Blåhøa.

It was never considered safe to walk under a glacier. Speilsalen collapsed in August 2007.

References

External links
 Article with pictures from glaciers in Trollheimen

Glaciers of Norway
Oppdal
Landforms of Trøndelag
Former landforms
Ice caves